Orippurathu Bhagavathy Temple (Malayalam: ഒരിപ്പുറത്തു ഭഗവതി ക്ഷേത്രം) is a 1200 year old ancient Hindu temple in Thattayil, near Pandalam in Kerala. It is the one of most famous bhagavathi temples in Central Travancore. The main deity of the temple is Goddess Kali. Sub deities include Lord Ganesha, Lord Krishna, Naga Rajav, Naga Yakshi, Rekshassu, Yogeeshwaran, Yakshi Amma and Madan Swamy. Orippurathu Bhagavathi Temple is situated about 7 km from Pandalam and 12 km from Pathanamthitta. It is located 2 km from National Highway 183A.

See also 
 Thattayil
 Pathanamthitta District
 Pandalam
 Ezhamkulam
 Vallicode
 Nariyapuram

References 

Hindu temples in Pathanamthitta district
Bhagavathi temples in Kerala